Anglicana is an album by English folk musician Eliza Carthy. It was the winner of the "Best Album" category of the 2003 BBC Radio 2 Folk Awards, and was nominated for the 2003 Mercury Music Prize, but lost to Dizzee Rascal's Boy in Da Corner.

Track listing
All tracks traditional arr. Eliza Carthy except where noted.

Personnel
 Eliza Carthy - fiddle, vocals, octave violin (track 2), piano (track 9)
 Barnaby Stradling - acoustic bass (tracks 1, 6, 10)
 John Spiers - melodeon (tracks 1, 5, 6)
 Jon Boden - fiddle (tracks 1, 5, 6)
 Donald MacDougal - guitar (track 1)
 Donald Hay - drums and percussion (tracks 1, 6, 10), hammer and girders (track 6)
 Ben Ivitsky - viola (track 2), guitar (tracks 3, 5), semi-acoustic guitar and trombone (track 10)
 Tim van Eyken - melodeon (track 2), guitar (tracks 2, 7), harmonica (track 5)
 Maria Gilhooley - vocals (track 4)
 Norma Waterson - vocals (track 4)
 Will Duke - concertina (track 4)
 Dan Quinn - melodeon (track 4)
 Tom Salter - electric guitar (track 5)
 Martin Carthy - guitar (track 8)
 Martin Green - piano accordion (track 10)
 Doug Duncan - trumpet (track 10)
 Greg Ivitsky - alto saxophone (track 10)
 Heather Macleod - vocals (track 10)
 Mary Macmaster - vocals (track 10)

References

2002 albums
Eliza Carthy albums